Healdsburg Transit (or HT) is a bus agency providing local service to Healdsburg, California.

HT provides fixed-route and dial-a-ride service. Transfers are possible to Sonoma County Transit. HT participates in the free rides spare-the-air program from the MTC.

References

Bus transportation in California
Public transportation in Sonoma County, California
Healdsburg, California